Danforth Township may refer to the following townships in the United States:

 Danforth Township, Iroquois County, Illinois
 Danforth Township, Pine County, Minnesota